Eugene Thomas Bolden (July 23, 1899 – September 6, 1991) was an American competition swimmer who represented the United States at the 1920 Summer Olympics in Antwerp, Belgium.  Bolden competed in the men's 1,500-meter freestyle and finished fifth in the event final with an estimated time of 24:04.3.

References

External links
 
 

1899 births
1991 deaths
American male freestyle swimmers
Olympic swimmers of the United States
Sportspeople from Memphis, Tennessee
Swimmers at the 1920 Summer Olympics